Flame (불꽃 – Bulggot) is a 1975 South Korean film directed by Yu Hyun-mok. It was awarded Best Film at the Grand Bell Awards ceremony.

Plot
In this anti-communist film, a young man hiding from the Korean War learns about his father's death while fighting the Japanese. By telling him the family history, his mother inspires him to fight the North Korean communists.

Cast
Hah Myung-joong
Kim Jin-kyu
Ko Eun-ah
Yun So-ra

Bibliography

Notes

External links

Best Picture Grand Bell Award winners
1970s Korean-language films
South Korean drama films
Films directed by Yu Hyun-mok